Pavel Besta (born 2 September 1982) is a Czech football player, currently playing for FK Seko Louny.

Club career
Besta started football career in his native Ostrava at local side Baník Ostrava. He was a member of Baník's 2003–2004 season title-winning squad. The next season, Baník played in the first round of the UEFA Cup, with Besta playing in both legs of the 4–1 aggregate defeat to English Premier League side Middlesbrough. During that season, he also won the Czech Cup with Baník.

In 2007, he moved to Viktoria Žižkov, where he spent two seasons. In his second season, Besta was part of the team that saw Žižkov relegated to the Czech 2. Liga.

In January 2010, Besta moved to Slovakia to play for Slovak Superliga side MFK Ružomberok. At the time of the transfer, he had played over 200 games in the Czech Gambrinus liga. He played 13 times for Ružomberok as they finished the season in fifth place.

Following his release from Ružomberok, Besta joined English Conference Premier side Luton Town on an initial trial period. He signed a one-year contract in August 2010 after impressing in a friendly against Newcastle United. However, he did not impress when he had a full-time contract, being the target of abuse from Luton fans following an error which led to a goal in a league game against Tamworth which Luton went on to lose 3–1. After just nine appearances, Besta was released from his contract with Luton in January 2011.

International career
Besta played for the Czech Republic youth national teams from under-15 level. He played five matches for the U-20 national team at the 2001 FIFA World Youth Championship in Argentina. Between 2002 and 2003, Besta played seven times for the Czech Republic under-21 team.

Achievements 
Czech Champion: 2003–2004
Czech Cup: 2005

References

External links
 
 
 Profile at MFK Ružomberok website

1982 births
Living people
Sportspeople from Ostrava
Czech footballers
Czech Republic youth international footballers
Czech Republic under-21 international footballers
Association football midfielders
Czech First League players
FC Baník Ostrava players
FK Viktoria Žižkov players
MFK Ružomberok players
Luton Town F.C. players
Sandecja Nowy Sącz players
Slovak Super Liga players
National League (English football) players
Expatriate footballers in Slovakia
Expatriate footballers in England
Expatriate footballers in Poland
Czech expatriate footballers
Czech expatriate sportspeople in Slovakia
Czech expatriate sportspeople in England
Czech expatriate sportspeople in Poland